Andrei Yuryevich Tsaplin (born 22 January 1977) is a Russian former professional footballer.

Club career
He made his debut in the Russian Premier League in 1996 for PFC CSKA Moscow.

Honours
 Russian Premier League runner-up: 1998.
 Russian Premier League bronze: 1999.
 Russian Cup winner: 2002.
 Russian Cup finalist: 2000.

References

External links
 
 

1977 births
Sportspeople from Perm, Russia
Living people
Russian footballers
Russia youth international footballers
Russia under-21 international footballers
Association football defenders
Russian expatriate footballers
Expatriate footballers in Belarus
Russian Premier League players
PFC CSKA Moscow players
FC Arsenal Tula players
FC Sokol Saratov players
FC Moscow players
FC Salyut Belgorod players
FC SKA-Khabarovsk players
FC Neman Grodno players